Wakefield is a constituency created in 1832, represented by Simon Lightwood of the Labour Party since 2022.

Boundaries

1885-1918: The existing parliamentary borough, and so much of the parish of Sandal Magna as lies to the north-east of the Great Northern and Manchester, Sheffield and Lincolnshire Railway, being the portion known as Belle Vue.

1918–1950: The County Borough of Wakefield.

1950–1983: The County Borough of Wakefield, the Urban District of Horbury, and part of the Rural District of Wakefield.

1983–1997: The City of Wakefield wards of Horbury, Wakefield Central, Wakefield East, Wakefield North, Wakefield Rural, and Wakefield South.

1997–2010: The City of Wakefield wards of Wakefield Central, Wakefield East, Wakefield North, and Wakefield Rural, and the Metropolitan Borough of Kirklees wards of Denby Dale and Kirkburton.

2010–present: The City of Wakefield wards of Horbury and South Ossett, Ossett, Wakefield East, Wakefield North, Wakefield Rural, and Wakefield West.

Latest boundary changes
Parliament accepted the Boundary Commission's Fifth Periodic Review of Westminster constituencies which altered this constituency for the 2010 general election, removing all three rural wards from the neighbouring borough of Kirklees that reached far to the south-west and instead adding wards from the abolished Normanton constituency to the immediate west, since which time the seat has comprised three-quarters of the West Yorkshire city of Wakefield along with Ossett, Horbury and small outlying settlements.

The far eastern suburbs of the city and its southern part falls within the Wakefield South ward and this is in the Hemsworth seat, the largest towns of which are, by a small margin, the towns of South Elmsall and South Kirkby, which form a contiguous settlement  to the east.

History

Predecessor seats
Electors of the area, since five years before the Model Parliament of 1295 until 1826 had entitlement to vote for the two representatives for Yorkshire, the largest county in the country.  Parliament legislated for, from an unusual disfranchisement in 1826 of a Cornish rotten borough, two additional MPs. From April 1784 until September 1812, one of the two members elected was William Wilberforce, internationally recognised as a leading figure in abolitionism (the anti-slavery movement).  The large county was given far greater representation by the Reform Act 1832: Belle Vue's electors until 1885, alongside other Forty Shilling Freeholders non-resident in the Parliamentary Borough of Wakefield itself but owning such property in any part of the county division could elect the two members for that division: this became the West Riding of Yorkshire from 1832 until 1865 (which had its polling place in this city), after which, the relevant county subdivision became the Southern West Riding until 1885.

Creation
Wakefield became a county division under the Redistribution of Seats Act 1885, drawing in, as an extension, the Belle Vue area of the parish of Sandal Magna.

Summary of results
Wakefield returned Labour MPs from 1932 to 2017. The size of majority had fluctuated between absolute and marginal.  The 2015 result gave the seat the 27th-smallest majority of Labour's 232 seats by percentage of majority. In 2019, Wakefield lost the Labour majority and returned the first Conservative MP in 87 years.

The seat was represented from 2019 to 2022 by Imran Ahmad Khan, who was elected as a member of the Conservative Party. Ahmad Khan was found guilty in 2022 of sexually assaulting a 15-year-old boy in 2008 serving an 18 month jail term resulting in his resignation as an MP. This triggered a by-election. His resignation became effective on 3 May 2022, when he was appointed Steward of the Chiltern Hundreds. A by-election was held on 23 June to replace him. Looked on as a key "Red Wall" seat, Labour regained the constituency with a substantial 12.7% swing.

Opposition parties
From 1923 until 2019 the runner-up candidate was a Conservative.  Six non-Labour candidates stood in 2015 of whom two, those which were Conservative and from UKIP won more than 5% of the vote, keeping their deposits.

Prominent frontbenchers
Rt Hon Arthur Greenwood was succeeded by Clement Attlee as leader of the Opposition in 1945, a few months before the party's landslide election victory. He had been from 1929 to 1931 the Minister of Health in the Second MacDonald ministry. In this role he successfully steered the Housing Act 1930 through both Houses of Parliament under the minority government, which expended more significant subsidies for slum clearance, allowing more affordable, spacious housing to be built for residents of slums.  When the wartime coalition government was formed, Winston Churchill appointed him to the British War Cabinet as Minister without Portfolio in 1940. He was generally seen in such a role as of little wartime legislative effect, but in May 1940 he emerged as Churchill's strongest and most vocal supporter in the lengthy War Cabinet debates on whether to accept or reject a peace offer from Germany. Without the vote in favour of fighting on by Greenwood and Clement Attlee, Churchill would not have had the slim majority he needed to do so.

Rt Hon Arthur Creech Jones was Secretary of State for the Colonies from October 1946 until February 1950, appropriately given that in June 1936 he pressed the Government, who were encouraging Colonies to set up memorials to King George V, to follow the example of Uganda and set up a technical educational institution. The Labour Party nominated him to the Colonial Office's Educational Advisory Committee in 1936, on which he served for nine years. In 1937, he was a founding member of the Trades Union Congress Colonial Affairs Committee, and in 1940 he founded the Fabian Colonial Bureau.

Mary Creagh held various shadow cabinet posts between 2010 and 2015. She resigned her post following the election of Jeremy Corbyn as Labour party leader.

Turnout
Turnout in general elections since 1918 has ranged between 54.5% in 2001 and 87.3% in 1950.

Constituency profile
The constituency has a rolling landscape with villages surrounding the city of Wakefield which is well connected to West Yorkshire in particular Leeds, Bradford and Huddersfield, however also via two junctions of the M1 to the west, to South Yorkshire such as Barnsley, Rotherham and Sheffield.  The small city itself has a large central trading and industrial estate, a central park, Clarence Park which includes a national athletics training squad, a Rugby League major team, Wakefield Trinity and its own Cathedral.  Wakefield Europort employs approximately 3,000 people, a major rail-motorway hub for Northern England imports and exports with EU countries.   Horbury and Ossett and towns in the low foothills of the Pennines.  In the far west of the constituency, there is the National Coal Mining Museum for England, on the site of the old Caphouse Colliery.

Workless claimants, registered jobseekers, were in November 2012 slightly higher than the regional average of 4.9%, at 5.3% of the population based on a statistical compilation by The Guardian, which is also higher than the national average of 3.8%.

Of the council wards, the Wakefield East and Wakefield North areas regularly return Labour councillors, whereas the others are marginal.  The Ossett ward is particularly unpredictable, and has elected Conservative, Labour, Liberal Democrat and UKIP councillors since 2005.  The other wards are contested between Labour and Conservative. Between 1997 and 2010 the constituency included the wards of Denby Dale and Kirkburton, generally Conservative-voting suburbs of Huddersfield in the neighbouring Kirklees borough. These joined Dewsbury, in the same borough, in 2010.

Members of Parliament

Elections

Elections in the 2020s

Elections in the 2010s

Elections in the 2000s

Elections in the 1990s

Elections in the 1980s

Elections in the 1970s

Elections in the 1960s

Elections in the 1950s

Election in the 1940s

Elections in the 1930s

Elections in the 1920s

Elections in the 1910s 

General Election 1914–15:

Another General Election was required to take place before the end of 1915. The political parties had been making preparations for an election to take place and by July 1914, the following candidates had been selected; 
Liberal: Arthur Marshall
Unionist: Edward Brotherton

Elections in the 1900s

Elections in the 1890s

Elections in the 1880s

 Caused by Mackie's death.

Elections in the 1870s

 Caused by the previous election being declared void on petition, on account of corruption.

Elections in the 1860s

 The writ, which had been suspended on 27 July 1859 with Leatham unseated due to being guilty of bribery via his agents, was restored and a by-election was called.

Elections in the 1850s

Elections in the 1840s

On petition, Holdsworth was disqualified due to also being the returning officer at the election, and Lascelles was declared elected on 21 April 1842.

Elections in the 1830s

See also
 List of parliamentary constituencies in West Yorkshire

Notes

References

Parliamentary constituencies in Yorkshire and the Humber
Constituencies of the Parliament of the United Kingdom established in 1832
Politics of Wakefield